Starc is a surname. Notable people with the surname include:

 Brandon Starc (born 1993), Australian high jumper
 Mitchell Starc (born 1990), Australian cricketer, brother of Brandon

See also
 STARC, abbreviation of State Area Command, mobilization entity of the National Guard of the United States in each state and territory
 Stařeč, town in the Czech Republic
 Alyssa Healy (born 1990), Australian cricketer, wife of Mitchell Starc